Mary of the Movies is a 1923 American silent semi-autobiographical comedy film based on the career of Marion Mack. It was written by Mack and her husband Louis Lewyn, and stars Mack and Creighton Hale. Hale and director John McDermott play fictionalized versions of themselves in the film, which was also directed by McDermott.

It was produced by Columbia Pictures and distributed by Film Booking Offices. A partial print of the film exists in Ngā Taonga Sound & Vision.

Production 
It was shot at the Sunset Gower Studios of Columbia Pictures.

Plot 
Mary (Mack), a country girl, moves to Hollywood to become a star, and earn money to pay for her brother's operation. She meets many famous stars, but has difficulty getting work. Finally, she gets a break when her resemblance to a star leads to her being cast in a film.

Cast 
Principals

Celebrity cameos

Reception
The film received good reviews, and did well at the box office. It was deemed better than a similar film released the same year, Hollywood.

References

External links

1923 comedy films
1923 films
American black-and-white films
Silent American comedy films
American silent feature films
Columbia Pictures films
1920s English-language films
Film Booking Offices of America films
Films set in Los Angeles
Films about filmmaking
Films directed by John McDermott
1920s American films